The Hilltoppers were an American popular music singing group.

Career
Originally the group was a trio formed at Western Kentucky State College (now Western Kentucky University), Bowling Green, Kentucky. The original members were three students; Jimmy Sacca (born July 26, 1929, Lockport, New York, died March 7, 2015, in Lexington, Kentucky); Donald McGuire (born October 7, 1931, Hazard, Kentucky, died September 7, 2018, in Lexington); and Seymour Spiegelman (October 1, 1930 – February 13, 1987). Spiegelman was born in Seneca Falls, New York and died in New York City. They took their name from the nickname of the Western Kentucky athletic teams.

They later added a pianist, Billy Vaughn (April 12, 1919 – September 26, 1991). Vaughn was born in Glasgow, Kentucky. Vaughn was eventually to become famous in his own right as an orchestra leader.

In 1952, they recorded a song, "Trying", written by Vaughn. A local disc jockey sent a copy to Randy Wood at Dot, and he agreed to distribute the record. It became a top 10 hit single. They went on to record a number of additional hits until their break-up. Their 1953 release, "P.S. I Love You," sold over one million copies, and was awarded a gold disc.

Spiegelman died in New York City. Vaughn died in Escondido, California. Both Sacca and McGuire died in Lexington.

Hit records

References

Further reading

  - Excerpt on Google Books

External links
The Hilltoppers Page
Remembering the Hilltoppers on the Western Kentucky University website
The Interlude Era page on the Hilltoppers
Department of Library Special Collections, Western Kentucky University

American vocal groups
Musical groups from Kentucky
Traditional pop music singers
Western Kentucky University alumni
Vocal quartets
Dot Records artists
Musical groups established in 1952
Musicians from Bowling Green, Kentucky
1952 establishments in Kentucky